Pavel Sidorov (born August 8, 1976) is a Kazakh former swimmer, who specialized in sprint freestyle and backstroke events. Sidorov competed for Kazakhstan in two swimming events at the 2000 Summer Olympics in Sydney. He eclipsed a FINA B-cut of 58.69 (100 m backstroke) from the Kazakhstan Open Championships in Almaty. On the first day of the Games, Sidorov placed twenty-first for the Kazakhstan team in the 4×100 m freestyle relay. Teaming with Sergey Borisenko, Andrey Kvassov, and Igor Sitnikov in heat three, Sidorov swam a third leg and recorded a split of 52.14, but the Kazakhs settled only for last place in a final time of 3:28.90. The following day, in the 100 m backstroke, Sidorov placed fifty-second on the morning prelims. Swimming in heat one, he edged out Bolivia's Mauricio Prudencio on the final length to grab a fourth seed by 0.13 seconds in a time of 1:01.02.

References

1976 births
Living people
Kazakhstani male backstroke swimmers
Olympic swimmers of Kazakhstan
Swimmers at the 2000 Summer Olympics
Kazakhstani male freestyle swimmers
People from Shymkent
Swimmers at the 1998 Asian Games
Asian Games medalists in swimming
Asian Games bronze medalists for Kazakhstan
Medalists at the 1998 Asian Games
20th-century Kazakhstani people
21st-century Kazakhstani people